In poker, the buck or dealer button is a marker used to indicate the player who is dealing or, in casino games with a house dealer, the player who acts last on that deal (who would be the dealer in a home game). The term button is also used for a variety of plastic discs, or lammers, used by casinos to mark the status of players.

History

When poker became a popular saloon game in the United States in the middle of the nineteenth century, the integrity of the players was unreliable and the honor codes that had regulated gambling for centuries became inadequate. Because the dealer has the greatest opportunity to cheat (by manipulating the specific cards that players receive, or by inspecting the dealt cards), the players would take turns in this role. To avoid arguments about whose turn it was to deal, the person who was next due to deal would be given a marker. This marker was moved clockwise around the table after each hand. A knife was commonly used as a marker, and the marker became generally known as a "buck", as an abbreviated reference to the buck's horn that formed the handle of many knives at that time.

When the dealer had finished dealing the cards he "passed the buck". According to Martin, the earliest use of the phrase in print is in the July 1865 edition of Weekly New Mexican: "They draw at the commissary, and at poker after they have passed the buck." The phrase then appears frequently in many sources so it probably originated at about this time. However, Mark Twain cited it as common slang in Virginia City when he was a reporter there in 1862.

"Passing the buck" soon became a metaphor for dodging responsibility. U.S. President Harry S. Truman was noted for a sign in his office reading "The buck stops here." It was a gift from  Fred Canfil, who found a similar sign in the warden's office at the Federal Reformatory at El Reno, Oklahoma.

The use of other small disks as such markers led to the alternative term "button". Silver dollars were later used as markers and it has been suggested that this is the origin of "buck" as a slang term for "dollar," though by no means is there universal agreement on this subject. The marker is also referred to as "the hat". The origin of this term is believed to stem from the wearing of a hat having been used to denote dealership.

Dealer button

Today, a dealer button is typically a white plastic disc with the word "Dealer" on each side. While in most home games, the player holding the dealer button deals the cards, in a casino or cardroom, an employee handles this responsibility.

The dealer button is sometimes modified to indicate a secondary detail about the hand being played—for example, a kill game may use a button with the word "Kill" on one side to show that the current hand is a kill pot, and turn the "Dealer" side up to show that the kill is off, or a dealer's choice game might replace the dealer button with a placard indicating the chosen game.

The term "button" is often used to refer to the dealer position, which is the position whose turn to bet comes last. Being "on the button" is therefore the most advantageous and most profitable position in poker.

Other buttons

In casino and card room cash games, the dealer's well may contain an assortment of laminated discs that the dealer may place in front of a player's seat under certain conditions. Properly called lammers (rhymes with 'spammers'), but also referred to as buttons, they are separate from and used differently from a dealer button.

The following table lists the most common lammers and their significance:

See also
 Poker jargon

References

Martin, Garry. 'Pass the buck', The Phrase Finder Retrieved May 13, 2005

Poker gameplay and terminology

sv:Poker#Material